The 1937 Bowling Green Falcons football team was an American football team that represented Bowling Green State College (later renamed Bowling Green State University) in the Ohio Athletic Conference (OAC) during the 1937 college football season. In their third season under head coach Harry Ockerman, the Falcons compiled a 3–4–1 record (2–3–1 against OAC opponents), finished in 12th place out of 19 teams in the OAC, and outscored opponents by a total of 80 to 56. John Cheetwood was the team captain.

The newly-constructed Bowling Green University Stadium was dedicated on October 16, 1937. The concrete structure had seating for 3,148 spectators and a pressbox for 35 reporters. It was built as a Works Progress Administration project at a cost of $50,000.

Schedule

References

Bowling Green
Bowling Green Falcons football seasons
Bowling Green Falcons football